"The Day That Never Comes" is a song by heavy metal band Metallica, and the lead single from their ninth studio album, Death Magnetic. The song was released to the radio and for digital download on August 21, 2008.

The working title of the song was "Casper", as shown in the Mission: Metallica videos and in Demo Magnetic.

Composition
Like previous ballads and downbeat songs by Metallica, it is the fourth track of the album. Rock Sound has also compared the song to the likes of Thin Lizzy. The intro starts out with clean guitars that carry into the verses, while the choruses are backed with heavily distorted guitars. The bridge speeds up gradually and eventually leads into fast-paced harmony between the guitars and a long guitar solo by Hammett, a build-up comparable to that of "One", "Welcome Home (Sanitarium)" and "Fade to Black". The ending of the song, like the previously mentioned ballads, is purely instrumental, featuring numerous solos and chord progressions.

Music video
A music video for the song was filmed in the desert outside Los Angeles on July 31, 2008, directed by Danish filmmaker Thomas Vinterberg. It was premiered on the band's official page at midnight on September 1, 2008.

The video depicts two Marines riding a HMMWV in a desert and getting hit by an explosion. After they take cover and look for the attacker, one of them reveals that he suffered a wound. The other Marine provides first aid and calls for help, and while he's eventually medevaced by a helicopter, it is implied that he fainted. The video then forwards to another situation involving the remaining Marine in another group riding a HMMWV and getting stopped in the road by a Yugo and a civilian in front of it holding a jumper cable in the air. The group, suspecting it might be an ambush, circles around the car and keeps the man at gunpoint, only to find a woman in chador in the back seat. They order her out of the car, but she approaches the protagonist, who keeps holding her at gunpoint. The video then climaxes when the Marines nervously look at each other, fearing that she might be a suicide bomber, but eventually the Marine lowers his weapon and signals to the rest to do the same. The Marines help the man to push start the car, and the protagonist remains looking at the sky. Scenes of the band performing in the desert are interspersed within the video.

Concepts
On , in an MTV interview, the song lyrics were said to tackle the subject of forgiveness and resentment. The band's drummer Lars Ulrich claimed that the lyrics were inspired by a father-son relationship. The content of the video itself is of a different theme or setting than what the lyrics themselves were written about, a second interpretation. The video is said to be in a war background in comparison to the "One" video, but will not make any modern day references as in the war in Iraq and the Middle East (although the video depicts images of Middle East war in present day, they do not imply any political statement).
Frontman James Hetfield spoke on the lyrics of the song and also the radical difference of the song lyrics and vision intended to the music video.

Lead guitarist Kirk Hammett and Ulrich also commented by stating ultimately, the concept of the video deals with humanity and the relationships between human beings and how your basic sense of humanity can override any sort of politicized situation.

In pop culture
"The Day That Never Comes" appears as part of the Death Magnetic album DLC for Guitar Hero III: Legends of Rock and it was later optimized to be used for  Guitar Hero: World Tour, Guitar Hero: Metallica, Guitar Hero 5, Band Hero and Guitar Hero: Warriors of Rock.
The song was used in the video game DJ Hero 2 mixed with Kanye West's "Love Lockdown."
The song was featured in TV show Once Upon a Time and in the end credits to the documentary Paradise Lost 3: Purgatory.

Track listing

 "No Remorse" was recorded in Orlando, Florida in 2003.

Personnel
Metallica
 James Hetfield – vocals, rhythm guitar, harmony guitar
 Lars Ulrich – drums
 Kirk Hammett – lead guitar
 Robert Trujillo – bass

Production
 Rick Rubin – producer
 Ted Jensen – mastering
 Greg Fidelman – mixing
 Thomas Vinterberg – music video director

Chart performance
The song debuted and peaked on Billboard'''s Hot 100 at number 31, giving the band their seventh top forty Hot 100 hit. It is also the band's highest-charting single on the Hot 100 since 1997's "The Memory Remains", which peaked at number 28. With less than four days of airplay, "The Day That Never Comes" debuted at number 7 on Billboards Mainstream Rock Chart, giving Metallica their sixteenth top ten hit on the chart. The next week it rose to number 2 on the Mainstream Rock Chart. In its third week, it reached number one on the chart, the band's sixth song to top the chart, and first since 2000's "I Disappear". It also debuted at number 25 on Modern Rock Tracks, where it eventually peaked at number 5, giving the band their first top five hit on that chart. It debuted in the top ten on the Canadian Hot 100, at number 9.

"The Day That Never Comes" spent a total of nine weeks at number one on the Hot Mainstream Rock Chart with its seven consecutive weeks at the top spot and two consecutive weeks prior.

The song was very successful internationally as well. On August 24, 2008, the song entered the UK Singles Chart at number 36 and peaked at number 19. In Ireland, it reached number 14. On the Australian ARIA Charts, the song also reached the top twenty, at number 18. It reached the top ten in New Zealand, Denmark, Norway, Finland, and Sweden.

It was voted in at number 88 on the Triple J Hottest 100, 2008 which is Australia's largest annual music poll. It was their only track off Death Magnetic'' to poll in the list.

Charts

Weekly charts

Year-end charts

Certifications

References

External links
 The Day That Never Comes (the music video as QuickTime video via Warner Bros. Records)

2008 singles
2000s ballads
Heavy metal ballads
Metallica songs
Songs written by James Hetfield
Songs written by Lars Ulrich
Songs written by Kirk Hammett
Songs written by Robert Trujillo
Canadian Singles Chart number-one singles
Number-one singles in Finland
Number-one singles in Norway
Song recordings produced by Rick Rubin
2008 songs